Aleksandr Gavrilov (also Alexander) may refer to:

 Alexander Gavrilov (figure skater) (born 1943), Soviet figure skater
 Alexander F. Gavrilov (born 1970), Russian literary critic and editor